"Do It Now" is the debut single by Australian duo Mashd N Kutcher and was released in December 2014.

Track listings
1 track single
 "Do It Now" - 2:46

Remixes
 "Do It Now" (Extended mix) - 3:41
 "Do It Now" (Slice n Dice mix) - 4:00
 "Do It Now" (Arcane Echo mix) - 3:05

Charts

Weekly charts

Year-end charts

Certifications

References

2014 singles
2014 songs
Australian songs
Mashd N Kutcher songs
Song recordings produced by Mashd N Kutcher